Earle Keith Plyler (April 26, 1897 in Greenville, South Carolina – June 8, 1976 in Tallahassee, Florida), was an American physicist and an important pioneer of infrared spectroscopy and molecular spectroscopy. He is the namesake of the "Earle K. Plyler Prize" of the American Physical Society.

Life 

Plyler originates from Greenville, South Carolina, where he graduated in Physics from Furman University (B.A. 1917, M.A. 1918). After scientific work at Johns Hopkins University he obtained his Ph.D. in 1924 at Columbia University. From 1924 until 1941 Plyler lectured at the University of North Carolina at Chapel Hill, subsequently at the University of Michigan from 1941 until 1945. In 1945 Plyler joined the National Bureau of Standards where he worked until 1962, when he became professor at Florida State University in Tallahassee.

Achievements 
Earle Plyler was an important pioneer of Molecular Spectroscopy and Infrared Spectroscopy. In his memory the American Physical Society regularly issues the "Earle K. Plyler Prize" for outstanding achievements in Molecular Spectroscopy. The Plyler Prize has already been issued to Nobel Prize Winners three times.

Sources 
 Interview of Dr. Earle K. Plyler by E. Scott Barr and W. James King on April 7, 1964, Niels Bohr Library & Archives, American Institute of Physics, College Park, MD USA
 Plyler, Earle Keith: E. K. Plyler Intellectual autobiography, 1962. 
 

1897 births
1976 deaths
People from Greenville, South Carolina
Furman University alumni
Columbia University alumni
Johns Hopkins University alumni
20th-century American physicists
University of Michigan faculty
Fellows of the American Physical Society